Fastrac  was a turbo pump-fed, liquid rocket engine. The engine was designed by NASA as part of the low cost X-34 Reusable Launch Vehicle (RLV) and as part of the Low Cost Booster Technology (LCBT, aka Bantam) project. This engine was later known as the MC-1 engine when it was merged into the X-34 project.

Design
The turbopump engine was designed to be used in an expendable booster in the LCBT project. As a result this led to the use of composite materials because of their significantly lower costs and production speed; this also reduced engine complexity since the fuel was not used for nozzle cooling. Based on knowledge and experience from the Space Shuttle's Reusable Solid Rocket Motor (RSRM) and the Solid Propulsion Integrity Program (SPIP), a Silica/phenolic material was chosen for the ablative liner with carbon/epoxy structural overlap.

The engine fuel was a mixture of liquid oxygen and kerosene (RP-1). These propellants are used by Saturn F1 rocket engine.  Kerosene does not have the same energy release as hydrogen, used with the Space Shuttle, but it is cheaper and easier to handle and store. Propellants were fed via a single shaft, dual impeller LOX/RP-1 turbo-pump.

The engine was started with a hypergolic igniter to maintain a simple design. Kerosene was injected and the engine was then running. The propellants were then fed into the gas generator for mixing and thrust chamber for burning.

The engine uses a gas generator cycle to drive the turbo-pump turbine, which then exhausts this small amount of spent fuel. This is the identical cycle used with the Saturn rockets, but much less complex than the Space Shuttle engine system.

The engine used an inexpensive, expendable, ablatively cooled carbon fiber composite nozzle and produced 60,000 lbf (285 kN) of thrust. After use nearly all of the engine's parts are reusable.

During the research phase in 1999 each Fastrac engine was costed at approximately $1.2 million. Production costs were expected to drop to $350,000 per engine.

History 
Engine system level testing started in 1999 at the Stennis Space Center. Earlier tests were on individual components at the Marshall Space Flight Center. NASA started full-engine, hot-fire testing in March, 1999, with a 20 second test to demonstrate the complete engine system. The engine was tested at full power for 155 seconds on July 1, 1999. A total of 85 tests were scheduled for the rest of 1999. As of 2000, 48 tests had been conducted on three engines using three test stands.

The first engine was installed on the X-34 A1 vehicle that was unveiled at NASA's Dryden Flight Research Center on April 30, 1999.

The Fastrac program was cancelled in 2001. After FASTRAC, NASA tried to salvage this design for use in other rockets such as Rotary Rocket's Roton and Orbital's X-34 project. The designation of the rocket engine was changed from the Fastrac 60K to Marshall Centre - 1 (MC-1). The MC-1 project was closed by July, 2009, after the X-34 project was terminated in March, 2009.

Components
NASA collaborated with industry partners to meet the principal objective to use commercial, off-the-shelf components. Industry partners included Summa Technology Inc., Allied Signal Inc., Marotta Scientific Controls Inc., Barber-Nichols Inc., and Thiokol Propulsion.

Legacy 

A similar set of technical solutions that reduce the cost of the engine was implemented in the SpaceX's Merlin 1A engine, which used a turbopump from the same subcontractor. The Merlin-1A was somewhat larger with a thrust of  versus  for Fastrac. The same basic design was capable of much higher thrust levels after upgrading the turbopump. Variants of the Merlin-1D achieve  of thrust as of May, 2018, though the combustion chamber is now regeneratively cooled.

Specifications

Vacuum thrust: 
Vacuum specific impulse: 314 s (3.0 kN·s/kg)
Chamber pressure: 633 psi 
Total mass flow: 91.90 kg/s
Gas generator pressure: 39.64 bar
Gas generator temperature: 888.89 K
Throat diameter: 0.22 m
Fuel: RP-1 (rocket grade kerosene)
Oxidizer: Liquid oxygen

See also 
Merlin (rocket engine) SpaceX booster engine
Kestrel (rocket engine) SpaceX small upper stage engine for Falcon-1
RD-180 RP-1 engine currently used in the US
RS-27A RP-1 engine currently used in the US
RD-191 contemporary Russian RP-1 engine
NK-33 record setting RP-1 engine, Soyuz 2-1-v first stage and used by Orbital Sciences in the Antares 100-series launcher
F-1 (rocket engine)
Executor (rocket engine)

References 

Note

 Ballard, R.O.; Olive, T.: Development Status of the NASA MC-1 (Fastrac) Engine; AIAA/ASME/SAE/ASEE Joint Propulsion Conference and Exhibit, 2000 Huntsville, AL, AIAA 2000-3898

External links
 NASA Fastrac Overview. 1999

Rocket engines using kerosene propellant
Rocket engines using the gas-generator cycle
Rocket engines of the United States